My Spring Days (lit. "The Spring Days of My Life") is a 2014 South Korean television series starring Kam Woo-sung, Choi Soo-young, Lee Joon-hyuk, and Jang Shin-young. It airs on MBC on Wednesdays and Thursdays at 21:55 for 16 episodes beginning September 10, 2014.

The plot uses the concept of cellular memory, a medical hypothesis that recipients' personalities and habits become similar to their donors.

Plot
Lee Bom-yi (Choi Soo-young) was once a terminally ill patient, but she's been given a second chance at life after getting a heart transplant and now lives each day to the fullest. She meets Kang Dong-ha (Kam Woo-sung), the CEO of Hanuiron and a widower with two children who lost his wife to an accident. Bom-yi falls for Dong-ha, not knowing that her donor was Dong-ha's wife.

Cast

Main characters
Kam Woo-sung as Kang Dong-ha
Choi Soo-young as Lee Bom-yi
Lee Joon-hyuk as Kang Dong-wook
Jang Shin-young as Bae Ji-won

Supporting characters
Shim Hye-jin as Jo Myung-hee
Kwon Hae-hyo as Lee Hyuk-soo
Lee Ki-young as Song Byung-gil
Ga Deuk-hee as Joo Se-na
Jung Ji-so as Kang Poo-reum
Shin Rin-ah as young Kang Poo-Reum
Gil Jung-woo as Kang Ba-da
Min Ji-ah as Yoon Soo-jung
Lee Jae-won as Park Hyung-woo
Kang Boo-ja as Na Hyun-soon
Jo Yang-ja as Choi Bok-hee
Jang Won-young as Jo Gil-dong
Hwang Geum-hee

Production
Kam Woo-sung and Choi Soo-young were cast as leads on July 17, 2014.

My Spring Days began filming on August 19 and the first shoot took place in a marketplace in Suwon, Gyeonggi Province.

Ratings
The show beat its rivals, SBS My Lovely Girl and KBS2's Iron Man consistently and the show ended with a 10.5% viewer rating in the Seoul National Capital Area, ranking first among the Wednesday-Thursday dramas.

Awards and nominations

International broadcast
  - Skynet International Drama
  - Channel 9 MCOT HD
  - HTV7 (22/08/15)

See also
Summer Scent

References

External links
My Spring Days official MBC website 

My Blooming Life at MBC Global Media

2014 South Korean television series debuts
MBC TV television dramas
Korean-language television shows
2014 South Korean television series endings
South Korean medical television series
South Korean romance television series
Television series by Celltrion Entertainment